Valley Springs High School is a secondary school in Valley Springs, Arkansas, United States. The school is the sole high school serving grades 9 through 12 in the Valley Springs School District. In 2012, Valley Springs was nationally recognized with the Silver Award in the U.S. News & World Report Best High Schools ranking report.

History 
In 1912, the North Arkansas Conference of Methodist Churches felt a need to establish a high school in the Ozarks.  Valley Springs, with its academic background, was selected, and it became Valley Springs Training School.

In 1922, the first organized high school was started in an old two-story frame structure on the south hill at Valley Springs. For a dormitory, the school used the old Dr. Hale home above the spring. Part of this farm is now the present school system.

Academics 
The assumed course of study follows the Smart Core curriculum developed by the Arkansas Department of Education (ADE). Students complete regular (core) and career focus courses and exams and may select Advanced Placement (AP) coursework and exams that provide an opportunity for students to obtain college credit.

Athletics 
The Valley Springs High School mascot and athletic emblem is the tiger with green and white serving as its school colors.

For 2012-14, the Valley Springs Tigers compete in the 3A 1 East (Basketball) Conference under the administration of the Arkansas Activities Association (AAA). Interscholastic activities include baseball, basketball (boys/girls), cheer, cross country (boys/girls), golf (boys/girls), softball, tennis (boys/girls), track (boys/girls), and volleyball.

The Valley Springs Tigers boys basketball team has been one of the state's most successful with six state championships between 1950 and 1996, including three consecutive titles in 1950–52.

Notable alumni 
 James Dickey - collegiate basketball coach
 Tim Sherrill - Former MLB Player (St. Louis Cardinals)

References

External links 
 

Public high schools in Arkansas
Educational institutions established in 1912
Schools in Boone County, Arkansas
1912 establishments in Arkansas